
The following is a list of episodes of Wait Wait... Don't Tell Me!, NPR's news panel game, that aired during 2005.  Dates indicated are the episodes' original Saturday air dates.  Job titles and backgrounds of the guests reflect their status at the time of their appearance.

Unless otherwise indicated, all Wait Wait... episodes feature host Peter Sagal and announcer/scorekeeper Carl Kasell.  Also unless indicated, the show originated from Chicago, either through the studios of WBEZ or, from May 14, 2005 onward, the Bank One Auditorium (which would be rechristened the Chase Bank Auditorium later in the year after Chase Bank's acquisition of Bank One).

January

February

March

April

May

June

July

August

September

October

November

December

References

External links
Wait Wait... Don't Tell Me! Archives on NPR.org
WWDT.Me, an unofficial Wait Wait historical site

Wait Wait... Don't Tell Me!
Wait Wait Don't Tell Me
Wait Wait Don't Tell Me